Eagle Lodge is a historic Masonic lodge building located at Hillsborough, Orange County, North Carolina.  It was built in 1823, and two-story, three bay, square brick building in the Greek Revival style.  It has a low hipped roof with heavy box cornice and a one-story pedimented porch with Ionic order columns.

The Eagle Lodge was first chartered in 1791 and disbanded in 1799.  It was re-started in 1819, and decided in 1820 to build a building.  This was designed probably by North Carolina's state architect William Nichols.

It came to serve as the town's lecture hall, opera house, Civil War hospital, and other functions.  It was also known as the King Street Opera House.

It was deemed architecturally significant "as an interesting example of the adaptive usage of early Greek Revival motifs in a building constructed specifically as a Masonic lodge."

It was listed on the National Register of Historic Places in 1971.  It is located in the Hillsborough Historic District.

References

External links

Masonic buildings in North Carolina
Historic American Buildings Survey in North Carolina
Clubhouses on the National Register of Historic Places in North Carolina
Greek Revival architecture in North Carolina
Buildings and structures completed in 1823
Hillsborough, North Carolina
Buildings and structures in Orange County, North Carolina
National Register of Historic Places in Orange County, North Carolina
Individually listed contributing properties to historic districts on the National Register in North Carolina